Pretty Li Huizhen is a 2017 Chinese television series starring Dilraba Dilmurat in the title role, along with Peter Sheng, Vin Zhang and Li Xirui. The series is a remake of the South Korean drama She Was Pretty. It was first aired on Hunan TV from 2 January to 2 February 2017.

The series was a commercial success in China, ranking first in its timeslot during its run, and has over 7 billion views online.

Synopsis
Li Huizhen (played by Dilireba) was a pretty girl when she was young, but years of hardship have taken a toll on her physical appearance. Her childhood friend, Bai Haoyu (played by Sheng Yilun) was short and chubby, but grew up to be successful and attractive. 12 years later, Haoyu tracks down Huizhen to reconnect with her. They decided to meet, but Haoyu was unable to recognize Huizhen. Embarrassed by her looks and situation, Huizhen sends her stylish best friend, Xia Qiao (played by Li Xirui) to appear in her place. Things turn complicated when Huizhen lands an internship at a fashion magazine company she's been wanting to get into, and finds out that Haoyu is her new boss. Not knowing her true identity, Haoyu openly berates her clumsy nature. Meanwhile, Huizhen's colleague, Lin Yimu (played by Zhang Binbin) falls in love with her, and Xia Qiao also begin to develop feelings for Haoyu.

Cast

Main 
Dilraba Dilmurat as Li Huizhen (a.k.a. "Charlie" [查理], "Huizhen" [慧珍], "Little Sister" [妹妹] or "Explosion Head" [爆炸头])
Qu Zhihan as young Li Huizhen 
A kind and caring young woman who the crew relies on for hard work. She cares deeply for Haoyu even through all the times that he's wronged her. Huizhen is best friends with Xia Qiao and considers her as her sister. Although she cares for Yimu as a friend, she doesn't reciprocate his feelings.
Sheng Yilun as Bai Haoyu (a.k.a. "Mr. Bai", "Haoyu" [皓宇], "Fatty Yu" [白胖宇], "Deputy Editor-in-Chief Bai" [白副主编] or "Lao Bai" [老白])
Zhou Baizhen as young Bai Haoyu 
A strict and demanding man who treats his staffs horribly. Although Li Huizhen's clumsiness and klutz-like nature annoyed him at first, he slowly began to soften up to her and his staffs. He somewhat views Yimu as a rival, often feeling jealous when Huizhen's around him.
Zhang Binbin as Lin Yimu (a.k.a. "Diviner" [占卜者], "Yimu" [一木], "Aiden James")
An unruly man and jokester who's well respected member of the staff. He loves food and always asks Li Huizhen over to eat. Even though he is a prankster, he is very emotional, choosing to hide his feelings from most people. He has a special bond with Xia Qiao, bonding with her over the fact that the person they love doesn't love them back. He is in love and holds affection to Li Huizhen and is very protective of her. He doesn't like Haoyu, viewing him as undeserving of Huizhen.
Li Xirui as Xia Qiao (a.k.a. "Qiao'er" [乔儿] or "Qiao Qiao" [乔乔])
Zhu Nihua as young Xia Qiao
A fashionable young woman who works at a hotel. She houses with Li Huizhen and considers her as her best friend. Xia Qiao didn't expect herself to fall in love with Haoyu, but still does. She and Yimu often get together and talk about their loved ones.

Supporting

People at Immortal Magazine
Ren Wei as Vivian
The Editor-in-chief who is very high fashionable woman.
Wang Xiao as Lin Hao
The Column editor, a carefree and laid-back worker who is known for his eccentricities. He is the chairman's son.
Wang Yinan as Zhu Ying (a.k.a. "Sis Ying" [英姐] or "Sis Zhu Ying" [朱英姐])
The Fashion editor and a highly respected worker who has been at Immortal for thirteen years.
Song Wenzuo as Lin Husheng
A kind worker and the help mode team who has a crush on Han Xue and later become her boyfriend.
Zhao Zihui as Ya Ling, the Beauty team
Wang Yifei as Han Xue (a.k.a. "Little Xue Xue" [小雪雪] or "Little Xue" [小雪] or "Xue'er" [雪儿])
The assistant of the beauty team and a selfish worker who is looking for a rich man to marry, even already become Lin Husheng's girlfriend.
Hao Shuang as Lu Lu, the make-up assistant
Yang Yanru as Mei Li 
A worker and the mode team at Immortal who is known for her obsession with Diviner, an anonymous author.
You You as Anna, the public relations team

People around Li Huizhen
Wang Zaihe as Huizhen's father
Su Xin as Huizhen's mother 
Miao Zhongzhen as Li Huilin, Huizhen's little sister

People around Bai Haoyu
Li Dongheng as Eric, Haoyu's best friend who is Diviner’s manager.

People around Xia Qiao
Gu Kaili as Xia Huijing, Xia Qiao's birth mother
Cai Gang as Xia Qiao's father
Zhang Pingjuan as Luo Minli, Xia Qiao's stepmother

Others
Wang Chu as Department Chief
Zhang Jiayi as Gi Gi
Li Yunao as Pang Nansheng (the fat guy, eps. 1)
Yu Qing as Mike
Im Ho as Wang Xiao
Chen Saisai as Chen Fei
Gan Liying as Sis Yang
Mi Ya as Wang Shina
Wang Jiali as Han Ha
Li Dong as Bao Zi
Tian Rui as Teacher Zhang
Wu Qian as Clothing Store manager
Zhu Zicong
Long De as a countryside restaurant owner
Ge Xiaosong as President Ge of GIO
Bu Yaping as Store manager Xiao Li

Soundtrack

Reception

Premiere ratings 
 Highest ratings are marked in red, lowest ratings are marked in blue

Awards and nominations

International broadcast

References

External links
Pretty Li Huizhen on Weibo

2017 Chinese television series debuts
2017 Chinese television series endings
Chinese romantic comedy television series
Chinese television series based on South Korean television series
Television series by Jay Walk Studio
Television series by Mango Studios
Hunan Television dramas